Christian Grönroos (born 16 January 1947) is a Finnish academic focused on service and relationship marketing. His research interest is to "develop marketing based on a service logic: promise management and marketing; transforming manufacturing into service business."

Dr. Christian Grönroos is since 1999 Professor of Service and Relationship Marketing (prior to that 1984–1999 Professor of International and Industrial Marketing) at Hanken School of Economics Finland (Svenska handelshögskolan) and chairman of the board of the research and knowledge centre CERS Centre for Relationship Marketing and Service Management of this business university. He is an Honorary Professor at Nankai University and Tianjin Normal University, P.R.China as well as at Oslo School of Management, Norway. Between 2001 and 2007 he served as Guest Professor of Service Management at Lund University Sweden.

Professor in Marketing
Christian Grönroos has been selected as a "Legend in Marketing" – the first one outside North America – and his research work will be compiled and featured in the forthcoming "Legends in Marketing" Series, edited by Dr. Jagdish Sheth (Series Editor) and published by the Sage Publications. Other marketing scholars featured as Legends include Richard Bagozzi, Shelby Hunt, Philip Kotler, V. Kumar, Naresh Malhotra, Jagdish Sheth, Yoram Wind, and Gerald Zaltman.

Definitions and models
Service: "A service is a process that consist of activities that are more or less tangible. The activities are usually but not necessarily always taking place in the interaction between a customer and service personnel, and/or physical resources or products and/or the system of the service provider. The service is a solution to a customer's problem." (2002)
Total perceived quality (2002)

His last definition of marketing (2006) 
"Marketing is a customer focus that permeates organizational functions and processes and is geared towards making promises through value proposition, enabling the fulfilment of individual expectations created by such promises and fulfilling such expectations through support to customers' value-generating processes, thereby supporting value creation in the firm's as well as its customers' and other stakeholders' processes."

References

External links
 Christian Grönroos Official Home Page at Hanken School of Economics
 

1947 births
Living people
Academic staff of the Hanken School of Economics